This is a list of post-nominal letters used in Brunei after a person's name, most commonly to indicate that the person has been conferred with sovereign orders, decorations or medals.

Orders and decorations

References 

Post-nominal letters
Brunei